Maurice William Mantha Jr. (born January 21, 1961) is an American former professional ice hockey defenseman and who played twelve seasons in the National Hockey League (NHL) with the Winnipeg Jets, Pittsburgh Penguins, Edmonton Oilers, Minnesota North Stars, and Philadelphia Flyers.

Playing and coaching career
Mantha was born while his father, Moe Mantha Sr., was playing for the Cleveland Barons of the American Hockey League (AHL). He was subsequently raised in Canada, when his father retired from hockey and returned to his hometown of Sturgeon Falls, Ontario. Moe Mantha Jr. has represented the United States in international hockey; he was a member of the U.S. team in the 1981, 1985, and 1991 Ice Hockey World Championships as well as the 1992 Winter Olympics.

Mantha first played for the Toronto Marlboros of the Ontario Hockey Association in 1978, and was drafted by the NHL's Winnipeg Jets in 1980. He played for the Jets and their minor league farm teams until 1984, when he was traded to the Pittsburgh Penguins. He was then sent to the Edmonton Oilers in 1988; the Oilers traded him to the Minnesota North Stars later that same season. He later played for the Philadelphia Flyers and another stint with the Jets.

1992–93 was Mantha's final season as a player, for the AHL's Hershey Bears; he has since coached teams in the AHL (Hershey and the Cincinnati Mighty Ducks) and the ECHL's Columbus Chill. He coached the junior USA team out of Ann Arbor, Michigan, from 2000 to 2004. In 2005, Mantha was named as the head coach of the Detroit Gladiators of the new World Hockey Association, but the league never made it to the ice; instead, he served as head coach and general manager of the Windsor Spitfires of the Ontario Hockey League (OHL) until he was terminated for gross misconduct during the Akim Aliu/Steve Downie hazing scandal that ultimately resulted in the Spitfires being fined $35,000 under Mantha’s tenure. Mantha then served as the general manager and head coach for the French River Rapids of the NOJHL. On February 16, 2016, he was named interim head coach of the Saginaw Spirit of the OHL, making his second trip behind the Spirit bench, replacing the recently fired Greg Gilbert. He was not retained at the end of that season. In 2017, he was hired as the head coach and general manager of the Brookings Blizzard in the North American Hockey League. The Blizzard retained Mantha for one season after it relocated as the St. Cloud Blizzard in 2019 before he retired in 2020.

Personal life
Mantha's nephew, Ryan Mantha, was drafted by the New York Rangers in the fourth round of the 2014 NHL Entry Draft, and was a prospect in the Edmonton Oilers organization before being  sidelined by an eye injury and a heart defect.

Career statistics

Regular season and playoffs

International

Coaching statistics

References

External links
 

1961 births
American ice hockey coaches
American men's ice hockey defensemen
Cincinnati Mighty Ducks coaches
Edmonton Oilers players
Hershey Bears coaches
Hershey Bears players
Ice hockey people from Ohio
People from West Nipissing
Ice hockey players at the 1992 Winter Olympics
Living people
Minnesota North Stars players
Olympic ice hockey players of the United States
Sportspeople from Lakewood, Ohio
Philadelphia Flyers players
Pittsburgh Penguins players
Saginaw Spirit coaches
Sherbrooke Jets players
Toronto Marlboros players
Tulsa Oilers (1964–1984) players
Windsor Spitfires coaches
Winnipeg Jets (1979–1996) draft picks
Winnipeg Jets (1979–1996) players
Ice hockey players from Ohio